Fort Macleod (Alcock Farm) Airport  is located about  south-southeast of Fort Macleod, Alberta, Canada.

References

External links
Page about this airport on COPA's Places to Fly airport directory

Registered aerodromes in Alberta
Municipal District of Willow Creek No. 26